Jonathan Mark Dibben (born 12 February 1994) is a British former racing cyclist, who rode professionally between 2015 and 2020, for the , ,  and  teams. His older brother Peter Dibben is a British cycling champion on the track.

He rode at the 2015 UCI Track Cycling World Championships. At the 2016 UCI Track Cycling World Championships he won a gold medal in the points race and a silver medal in the team pursuit event. In October 2020, he was named in the startlist for the 2020 Giro d'Italia.

Major results

Track

2011
 National Championships
1st  Team pursuit
3rd Individual pursuit
 1st  Individual pursuit, National Junior Championships
2012
 National Championships
2nd Individual pursuit
2nd Scratch
 2nd  Omnium, UCI World Junior Championships
2014
 UEC European Championships
1st  Team pursuit
2nd  Omnium
 3rd Individual pursuit, National Championships
2015
 UEC European Championships
1st  Team pursuit
3rd  Omnium
 National Championships
2nd Scratch
3rd Individual pursuit
2016
 UCI World Championships
1st  Points race
2nd  Team pursuit
 1st  Points race, UEC European Under-23 Championships

Road

2011
 4th Paris–Roubaix Juniors
 8th Time trial, UCI World Junior Championships
2012
 1st Stage 3b Trofeo Karlsberg
 3rd Paris–Roubaix Juniors
 5th Road race, UCI World Junior Championships
2014
 1st Stage 2a (ITT) Le Triptyque des Monts et Châteaux
 6th Time trial, UCI World Under-23 Championships
2015
 8th Overall ZLM Tour
2016
 2nd Overall Le Triptyque des Monts et Châteaux
1st Stage 3a (ITT)
 2nd Ronde van Vlaanderen Beloften
 4th Duo Normand (with Scott Davies)
 7th Beaumont Trophy
 9th Road race, UCI World Under-23 Championships
2017
 1st Stage 6 (ITT) Tour of California
 6th Trofeo Porreres–Felanitx–Ses Salines–Campos
2018
 1st Stage 1b (TTT) Settimana Internazionale di Coppi e Bartali

Grand Tour general classification results timeline

References

External links

Biography at British Cycling
 

1994 births
Living people
British male cyclists
Sportspeople from Southampton
UCI Track Cycling World Champions (men)
British track cyclists
21st-century British people